The 1982 Football League Cup Final was a football match between Liverpool and Tottenham Hotspur on 13 March 1982 at Wembley Stadium. It was the final match of the 1981–82 Football League Cup, the 22nd staging of the Football League Cup, a football competition for the 92 teams in The Football League. Liverpool were the reigning champions and appearing in their third final. This was Tottenham's third final, having won their previous two appearances in 1971 and 1973.

Both teams entered the competition in the second round. Liverpool's matches were generally comfortable victories. They beat Middlesbrough 4–1 in the third round, but two of their ties went to a replay. Tottenham's matches were close affairs, the only match they won by more than one goal was their 2–0 victory against Wrexham in the third round, although they did not concede a single goal en route to the final.

Watched by a crowd of 100,000, Tottenham opened the scoring in the 11th minute when striker Steve Archibald scored. Tottenham maintained their lead until the 87th minute, when midfielder Ronnie Whelan equalised for Liverpool. With the scores level after 90 minutes the match went to extra time. Whelan scored again in the 111th minute to give Liverpool the lead and striker Ian Rush scored in the 119th minute to secure a 3–1 victory for Liverpool. It was their second League Cup victory and second in succession. The year before, Ray Clemence played for Liverpool, only to be on the losing side against his former team in 1982.

Route to the final

Match

Details

External links
LFC History Match Report

League Cup Final 1982
League Cup Final 1982
EFL Cup Finals
1981–82 Football League
March 1982 sports events in the United Kingdom
1982 sports events in London